"Days Go By" is a song co-written and recorded by Australian country music singer Keith Urban. It was released  on 28 June 2004, as the first single from his 2004 album Be Here. It became Urban's fifth number one single on the US Billboard Hot Country Songs chart in late-2004, spending a four-week stay at that position.  Urban wrote this song with Monty Powell.

Content
Starting with an acoustic guitar phrase and then built in D major around Urban's typical up-tempo banjo/mandolin-driven riffs with exuberant vocal yelps and electric guitar fills, the song's message is a variation on the carpe diem theme, as played off the song's title phrase.

Music video
A portion of the song's music video shows Urban appearing to walk forwards, while everyone else about him is walking backwards. This segment was actually filmed in the opposite direction, with Urban walking backwards.

In another part of the video, Urban makes a hand gesture, holding it parallel to the ground while raising and lowering it in an undulating motion, illustrating the line "I can feel it flying like a hand out the window in the wind". This inspired a collaborative project in which Keith Urban fans videotaped themselves imitating the motion while doing purposeful things most often by visiting recognizable landmarks (such as the Washington Monument, Yellowstone National Park, The Parthenon) and the most modest places, like Paducah, Kentucky. A compilation containing those videos was seen on the large image wall backdrop as the song was performed during Keith Urban's 2007 Love, Pain & the Whole Crazy World Tour.

The video won the CMT Award for Best Video of 2005.

Other performances
"Days Go By" is one of Urban's songs with the most pop and rock crossover appeal, and was featured in his sets at both the Live 8 concert in Philadelphia in 2005 and the Live Earth concert in New Jersey in 2007.

Chart performance
On the US Billboard Hot Country Songs chart, the song reached number one and spent four consecutive weeks at that position until it was knocked off by "Suds in the Bucket" by Sara Evans.

Weekly charts

Year-end charts

Certifications

References

2004 singles 
2004 songs 
Capitol Records Nashville singles
Keith Urban songs
Songs written by Monty Powell
Songs written by Keith Urban
Music videos directed by Wayne Isham
Song recordings produced by Dann Huff